Pterocheilus is an essentially holarctic genus of potter wasps with a fairly rich diversity in North America and a single Afrotropical species Pterocheilus eurystomus Kohl 1906 known from Socotra. They are usually rather large wasps characterized by reduced tegulae and prominently pilose labial palpi.

Species
The following species are classified under Pterocheilus:

Pterocheilus acuceps Bohart, 1940
Pterocheilus albofasciatus Smith, 1878
Pterocheilus arabicus Giordani Soika, 1970
Pterocheilus arizonicus Bohart, 1940
Pterocheilus asperatus (Bohart, 1999)
Pterocheilus auriantius Kostylev, 1940
Pterocheilus bakeri Cameron, 1909
Pterocheilus biglumis (Saussure, 1852)
Pterocheilus biplagiatus Cresson, 1879
Pterocheilus chesteri Carpenter, 1986
Pterocheilus chobauti Dusmet, 1928
Pterocheilus coccineus André, 1884
Pterocheilus comptus Cresson, 1879
Pterocheilus crispocornis Bohart, 1940
Pterocheilus cyathopus Bohart, 1940
Pterocheilus cyrenaicus Gribodo, 1924
Pterocheilus decorus Cresson, 1879
Pterocheilus denticulatus (Saussure, 1855)
Pterocheilus desertorum Bohart, 1940
Pterocheilus diversicolor Rohwer, 1911
Pterocheilus dives Radoszkowski, 1876
Pterocheilus eurystomus Kohl, 1906
Pterocheilus heptneri Kostylev, 1940
Pterocheilus hirsutipennis Bohart, 1940
Pterocheilus hurdi Bohart, 1950
Pterocheilus joffrei Dusmet, 1917
Pterocheilus kamanensis Gusenleitner, 1967
Pterocheilus laticeps Cresson, 1872
Pterocheilus linsleyi Bohart, 1940
Pterocheilus maltsevi Kostylev, 1940
Pterocheilus mandibularis Morawitz, 1889
Pterocheilus merpeba Giordani Soika, 1943
Pterocheilus mexicanus Saussure, 1870
Pterocheilus micheneri Bohart, 1940
Pterocheilus mirandus Cresson, 1897
Pterocheilus modestus Kostylev, 1935
Pterocheilus mongolicus Kohl, 1907
Pterocheilus morrisoni Cresson, 1879
Pterocheilus napalkovi Kurzenko, 1977
Pterocheilus nigricaudus Bohart, 1940
Pterocheilus nigrobilineolatus Giordani Soika, 1942
Pterocheilus numida Lepeletier, 1841
Pterocheilus oregonensis Bohart, 1940
Pterocheilus paenacuceps Bohart, 1950
Pterocheilus panamintensis Bohart, 1940
Pterocheilus pedicellatus Bohart, 1940
Pterocheilus peninsularis Bohart, 1948
Pterocheilus perpunctatus Giordani Soika, 1970
Pterocheilus phaleratus (Panzer 1797)
Pterocheilus pimorum (Viereck, 1908)
Pterocheilus propinquus Kostylev, 1940
Pterocheilus provancheri (Huard, 1897)
Pterocheilus pruinosus Cameron, 1908
Pterocheilus pusillus Kostylev, 1940
Pterocheilus quaesitus (Moravitz, 1895)
Pterocheilus quinquefasciatus Say, 1824
Pterocheilus schwarzi Gusenleitner, 1994
Pterocheilus sculleni Bohart, 1950
Pterocheilus seneconis Rohwer, 1911
Pterocheilus sibiricus (Moravitz, 1867)
Pterocheilus sparsipunctatus Bohart, 1950
Pterocheilus tenebricosus Gusenleitner, 1998
Pterocheilus texanus Cresson, 1872
Pterocheilus timberlakei Bohart, 1940
Pterocheilus trachysomus Bohart, 1940
Pterocheilus trichogaster Bohart, 1940
Pterocheilus tricoloratus Bohart, 1940
Pterocheilus varius Gusenleitner, 2002
Pterocheilus wollmanni Kostylev, 1940

References

Biological pest control wasps
Potter wasps